The orange-backed woodpecker (Reinwardtipicus validus) is a bird in the woodpecker family Picidae, found in southern Thailand, Malaya, Sarawak and Sabah in Malaysia, Brunei, Sumatra, and Java. It is  monotypic in the genus Reinwardtipicus.

Taxonomy
The orange-backed woodpecker was described and illustrated in 1825 by Dutch zoologist Coenraad Jacob Temminck in his Nouveau recueil de planches coloriées d'oiseaux from specimens that had been collected on the  Indonesian island of Java. He coined the binomial name Pic validus. The woodpecker is now the sole species placed in the genus Reinwardtipicus that was erected in 1854 by French naturalist Charles Lucien Bonaparte to accommodate the orange-backed woodpecker. The genus name Reinwardtipicus was chosen to honour the Dutch naturalist Caspar Reinwardt. His name is combined with picus, the Latin word for a woodpecker. The specific epithet validus is a Latin word meaning "strong" or "powerful". The orange-backed woodpecker belongs to the tribe Campephilini in the subfamily Picinae. Molecular genetic studies have show that the species is closely related to the woodpeckers in the genus Chrysocolaptes.

Two subspecies are recognised:
R. v. xanthopygius (Finsch, 1905) – the Malay Peninsula, Sumatra, and Borneo
R. v. validus (Temminck, 1825) – Java

References

External links

 
 
 
 
 

orange-backed woodpecker
Megapicini
Birds of Malesia
orange-backed woodpecker
Taxobox binomials not recognized by IUCN